Pictures at an Exhibition is a live album by English progressive rock band Emerson, Lake & Palmer, released in November 1971 on Island Records. It features the group's rock adaptation of Pictures at an Exhibition by Modest Mussorgsky, performed at Newcastle City Hall on 26 March 1971.

The band had performed the Mussorgsky piece since their live debut in August 1970, after keyboardist Keith Emerson had attended an orchestral performance of the piece several years before and pitched the idea to guitarist and frontman Greg Lake and drummer Carl Palmer, who agreed to adapt it while contributing sections to the arrangement. The album concludes with the concert's encore, "Nut Rocker", a rock adaptation of The Nutcracker originally arranged by Kim Fowley and recorded by B. Bumble and the Stingers in 1962.

Pictures at an Exhibition went to number 3 on the UK Albums Chart and number 10 on the US Billboard 200. In 2001, it was reissued as a remastered edition that included a studio version of the piece recorded in 1993.

Background

In February 1971, Emerson, Lake & Palmer finished recording their second studio album Tarkus. They resumed touring in the following month, which began with a UK leg that included a show at Newcastle City Hall, Newcastle on 26 March. The tour's setlist included their rock arrangement of the classical suite Pictures at an Exhibition by Modest Mussorgsky, which had been performed since their live debut in August 1970. Keyboardist Keith Emerson had attended an orchestral performance of the suite several years before, and bought a copy of the score. He pitched the idea of performing the suite to singer/bassist/guitarist Greg Lake and drummer Carl Palmer, who agreed to adapt it. Both members contributed their own arrangements and additions to the suite.

The band had already recorded and filmed a live performance of the Mussorgsky suite at the Lyceum Theatre in London, on 9 December 1970, and planned a live album release around August 1971. However, their dissatisfaction with the picture, editing, and audio led to the decision to record another show. Palmer deemed the film "shocking" which lacked any contemporary filming technique, and said the absence of engineer Eddy Offord to control the sound contributed to its substandard quality. The date at Newcastle City Hall was chosen for the new recording, and Palmer recalled the "amazing atmosphere" of the concert. Emerson said the venue was chosen as the band were popular there, and hoped to use its pipe organ. He was granted permission, but had to promise the Musician's Union he would not stick knives on the console, which he had done since he was in The Nice. The band paid for the recording costs themselves, with the aim of producing the best quality version. They arrived at Newcastle at 10am and underwent rehearsals and checks for several hours. The Lyceum concert film had a limited theatrical release, which Palmer said was only due to the fact that a group friend was in charge and let them release it. The film was released on DVD with Dolby surround sound in 2000.

The album was recorded using the mobile recording unit from Pye Records. The opening section, "Promenade", features Emerson playing a Harrison & Harrison pipe organ which was installed at the venue in 1928. The organ console is some way above stage level, at the top of a stepped terrace typically used for choral performances. Palmer's drum roll connecting "Promenade" to the following section was added to give Emerson time to return to his keyboards.

Arrangement
The band's arrangement of the suite uses only four of the ten parts in Mussorgsky's suite, along with the linking "Promenade" sections. The suite was performed live as one continuous piece, with new, group-written sections linking Mussorgsky's original themes.

Note that Mussorgsky's original compositions are listed in bold:

 Promenade: Organ solo and drum roll
 The Gnome: Group instrumental
 Promenade: Hammond organ and vocal, followed by a short synthesiser solo
 "The Sage": A new picture "drawn" by Lake in the mood of a medieval minnesang, works as sort of romantic prelude to "The Old Castle", followed by a synthesiser solo
 The Old Castle: An accelerated adaptation of the original theme
 "Blues Variation", a twelve-bar blues credited to the group, borrowing themes from The Old Castle and those that Emerson had previously performed with The Nice
 Promenade: Group instrumental
 The Hut of Baba Yaga: Group instrumental
 "The Curse of Baba Yaga" is a new title to the middle section of the original piece. The music is again an adaption of the original, the lyrics and vocal are credited to the group
 The Hut of Baba Yaga: Group instrumental, a reprise of "The Curse of Baba Yaga"
 The Great Gates of Kiev: Vocals and lyrics added by the group

Cover
The cover was designed and painted by William Neal, who produced every canvas. Palmer bought one of them after he had completed it. The album was packaged in a gatefold sleeve, the outside of which depicts blank picture frames labelled with the titles of the pictures: "The Old Castle", "The Gnome", etc. The paintings were large oil paintings containing various images related to the band, like the Tarkus background in "The Hut" and the white dove embossed into the titanium white oil paint in "Promenade" (visible only on the original painting), resembling the cover of the band's debut album. On the inner gatefold all of the paintings were revealed, but "Promenade" remains blank; this section of the suite is not about a picture, but represents a walk through the exhibition. Some later pressings on CD use only the "revealed" version.

Neal's paintings were later hung at Hammersmith Town Hall, and photographed by Keith Morris and Nigel Marlow, both former graduates from Guildford School of Art.

Release and reception

After the album was recorded Lake was wary that its classical content would make the public compare Emerson, Lake & Palmer to The Nice, and argued against its release before Tarkus. As a compromise Pictures at an Exhibition was to be released at a budget price, but upon learning this Atlantic Records vetoed the idea. The label could not decide whether to promote it as a rock or classical record and at one point, considered putting it out on its subsidiary, Nonesuch Records. Fearing that this would lead to poor sales, the band decided to shelve the work. Palmer said the group received letters from fans expressing their anger at the delay. After the album was broadcast in its entirety on WNEW-FM in New York City, the public's demand for the album convinced Atlantic to release it at full price. The band had hoped to release it in the UK for 99p, but it was released at £1.49. Originally, the group had thought of releasing Pictures at an Exhibition as a double album, with the suite on side one and the material they had recorded for Trilogy (1972) on side two, but they thought the public had waited long enough for Pictures to be released and wanted to put it out sooner.

The album was released in November 1971, and reached number 3 on the UK Albums Chart. Budget-priced albums were eligible for inclusion at the time of release, but a change in chart regulations in early 1972 excluded them, which meant that the album disappeared from the chart after just five weeks. In the US, the album peaked at number 10 on the Billboard 200 chart.

The album was included in the book 1001 Albums You Must Hear Before You Die.

Reissues
The album was reissued in 2001 with a new master and a bonus studio version of the suite recorded in 1993 that was released The Return of the Manticore (1993) box set and some pressings of In the Hot Seat (1994). A new remaster was issued in a 2005 Deluxe Edition included the live performance of the suite from the 1970 Isle of Wight Festival. The album was remastered once more in 2016, containing live tracks from the 1972 Mar y Sol Festival and the 1970 Lyceum Theatre concert.

Track listing
All music by Modest Mussorgsky, except where noted. All lyrics by Greg Lake and Richard Fraser.

Personnel
Emerson, Lake & Palmer
Keith Emerson – Hammond C3 and L100 organs, Moog modular synthesizer, Minimoog, Clavinet
Greg Lake – bass guitar, acoustic guitar, vocals
Carl Palmer – drums, percussion

Production
Greg Lake – producer
Eddy Offord – engineer
Joseph M. Palmaccio – remastering
Keith Emerson – musical arrangement
Greg Lake – musical arrangement
William Neal – cover design and painting
Nigel Marlow – photography
Keith Morris – photography

Charts

Certifications

References

Concept albums
Albums produced by Greg Lake
Emerson, Lake & Palmer live albums
1972 live albums
Island Records live albums